Tipperary Excel is an arts and cultural centre located in Tipperary, Ireland, opened in 2001.

History

The Excel was opened by then-Taoiseach Bertie Ahern on 5 May 2001. Its theatre is named after Simon Ryan (died 2011), a brother of Tony Ryan and a longtime promoter of amateur theatre.

Tipperary Excel Youth Theatre Group holds an annual play, and productions touring Ireland regularly play at the Excel.

Facilities
The Excel comprises the Simon Ryan Theatre, cinemas, an art gallery, tourism office, interpretative centre, Internet café and a genealogy research centre. It also hosts a dance school.

The Simon Ryan Theatre has a stage measuring 40 x 27 feet (12 x 8 m). The proscenium arch is 33 feet (10 m) wide and 18 ft 7 in (5.6 m) high.

References

Theatres in County Tipperary